Lot 5 is a township in Prince County, Prince Edward Island, Canada created during the 1764–1766 survey of Samuel Holland.  It is part of Egmont Parish.

Communities

Incorporated municipalities:

 Alberton
 Northport

Civic address communities:

 Alberton
 Bloomfield
 Bloomfield Corner
 Brooklyn
 Cascumpec
 Duvar
 Forestview
 Fortune Cove
 Glengarry
 Howlan
 Kelly Road
 Mill River East
 Northport
 Piusville
 Rosebank
 St. Anthony
 Union
 Woodstock

History
Lot 5 was awarded to Edward Lewis in the 1767 land lottery while Lewis was the Member of Parliament (MP) for Radnor. The township became jointly owned with John Hill in 1779 and subsequently went through various owners under feudalism when Prince Edward Island was a British colony prior to Canadian Confederation.

References

05
Geography of Prince County, Prince Edward Island